The Emanuel Point Shipwreck Site is a historic site near Pensacola, Florida, United States. It is located off Emanuel Point.  It has been identified as the galleon San Juan, of the fleet that carried conquistador Tristan de Luna and his army to La Florida in 1559.  It sank along with most of the fleet during a hurricane that struck the coast shortly after Luna's arrival.  On March 4, 1996, it was added to the U.S. National Register of Historic Places.

References

 Escambia County listings at National Register of Historic Places
 Escambia County listings at Florida's Office of Cultural and Historical Programs
 Emanuel Point Ship Excavation at The University of West Florida

National Register of Historic Places in Escambia County, Florida
Shipwrecks of the Florida coast